

Governor Beekman 

Gerardus Beekman (1653–1723), Acting Governor of the Province of New York from 1710 to 1710
Wilhelmus Beekman (1623–1707), Governor of the Colony of Swedes from 1658 to 1663

See also
Beekman Winthrop (1874–1940), Governor of Puerto Rico from 1904 to 1907